In the Rear of the Enemy, is a 1941 Soviet war film directed by Yevgeni Shneider.

Plot 
The film tells of the courage of a group of Soviet scouts who will enter the enemy's rear, namely, the farm that the White Finns left.

Starring 
 Nikolay Kryuchkov		
 Aleksandr Grechanyy	
 Pavel Shpringfeld
 Aleksandr Baranov	
 Pyotr Sobolevsky	
 Pyotr Savin
 Nikolai Ryzhov
 Nikolai Yarochkin

References

External links 
 

1941 films
1940s Russian-language films
Soviet black-and-white films
Soviet World War II films
Russian World War II films